Lake Pariacocha (possibly from Quechua parya reddish, copper or sparrow, qucha lake) is a lake in the eastern part of the Cordillera Blanca in the Andes of Peru. It is located in the Ancash Region, Asunción Province, Chacas District.

References 

Lakes of Peru
Lakes of Ancash Region